Czaplinek may refer to the following places:
Czaplinek, Łódź Voivodeship (central Poland)
Czaplinek, Masovian Voivodeship (east-central Poland)
Czaplinek in West Pomeranian Voivodeship (north-west Poland)